20 Lower Fort Street, Millers Point is a heritage-listed former residence used by the NSW State Government as a boarding house for more than 100 years but now restored and conserved to its former condition as a gentleman's residence when first built between 1841 qnd 1843 nowlocated at 20 Lower Fort Street, Millers Point, City of Sydney, New South Wales, Australia. The property was added to the New South Wales State Heritage Register on 2 April 1999.

History 
Millers Point is one of the earliest areas of European settlement in Australia, and a focus for maritime activities. Constructed during the early 1840s as one of a pair of London style townhouses, representing a significant streetscape element. First tenanted by the NSW Department of Housing in 1983.

Description 
Substantial Georgian style, six bedroom townhouse, based on the London model. Four storeys with separate kitchen/servants quarters and attic. Portico with ionic columns shared with neighbour. Iron lace cantilevered balcony on second storey, onto which open three french doors. Storeys: four; Construction: Painted rendered stone, slate roof. Iron lace on timber structured balcony. Style: Georgian.

The external condition of the property is good.

Modifications and dates 
External: Portico and ashlar facade added c.1863. .

Heritage listing 
As at 23 November 2000, this property is one of two Regency style townhouses based on the London model of four storeys with separate brick kitchen building having servants quarters above, and is in almost intact exterior condition.

It is part of the Millers Point Conservation Area, an intact residential and maritime precinct. It contains residential buildings and civic spaces dating from the 1830s and is an important example of 19th century adaptation of the landscape.

20 Lower Fort Street, Millers Point was listed on the New South Wales State Heritage Register on 2 April 1999.

See also 

Australian residential architectural styles

References

Bibliography

Attribution

External links
 
 

New South Wales State Heritage Register sites located in Millers Point
Victorian Regency architecture in New South Wales
Houses in Millers Point, New South Wales
Articles incorporating text from the New South Wales State Heritage Register
1850s establishments in Australia
Houses completed in the 19th century
Millers Point Conservation Area